Henry Wellge (1850-1917) was a lithographer in the United States. He produced panoramic maps. He had an office in Milwaukee, Wisconsin.

His view of Bangor, Maine depicts the era when sail and steam power were both in use on the Penobscot River.

Wellge was one of five men who produced more than half the panoramic maps in the Library of Congress' collection.

List of cities he depicted
Columbus, Georgia, 1886
Macon, Georgia, 1887
Memphis, Tennessee, 1887
Anniston, Alabama, 1887
Gadsden, Alabama, 1887
Montgomery, Alabama, 1887
Selma, Alabama, 1887
Tuskaloosa, Alabama, 1887
Hot Springs, Arkansas, 1888
Little Rock, Arkansas, 1887
Van Buren, Arkansas, 1888
Texarkana, Texas and Arkansas, 1888
Cairo, Illinois, 1888
West Superior, Wisconsin, 1887
Sioux City, Iowa, 1888

Gallery

References

1850 births
1917 deaths
Cartographers of North America
19th-century lithographers
20th-century lithographers
American lithographers